Aphnaeus asterius, the brick silver spot, is a butterfly in the family Lycaenidae. It is found in Sierra Leone, Ivory Coast, Ghana, southern Nigeria, Cameroon, Gabon, the Republic of the Congo, the Central African Republic and the Democratic Republic of the Congo (Équateur and Sankuru). The habitat consists of primary forests.

References

External links
Die Gross-Schmetterlinge der Erde 13: Die Afrikanischen Tagfalter. Plate XIII 69 d also (synonym) as argenteola Holland, 1890

Butterflies described in 1880
Aphnaeus
Butterflies of Africa